Kryz may be,

Kryz Reid
Kryts language